Santiago Denia Sánchez (born 9 March 1974), commonly known as Santi, is a Spanish retired footballer who played as a central defender, currently manager of the Spain under-21 national team.

He appeared in 297 La Liga matches over 11 seasons (two goals scored), with Albacete and Atlético Madrid. He won the 1996 league championship with the latter club.

Club career
Born in Albacete, Castile-La Mancha, Santi began playing professionally with his hometown side Albacete Balompié. He made his La Liga debut at age 18, and immediately became an undisputed starter as they constantly managed to retain their top-flight status.

Santi signed for Atlético Madrid in the summer of 1995, being crowned league and Copa del Rey champion in his first season as part of a defensive line which also included youth graduates Juan Manuel López and Roberto Solozábal. He appeared in 37 league matches during the campaign.

Following Atlético's 2000 relegation (he collected a career-worst 17 yellow cards), Santi gradually lost his importance in the team's plans. In 2004–05, after the signing of Pablo Ibáñez – who also came from Albacete – he featured in no games at all in the first half of the season, and was subsequently allowed to leave on loan in January 2005 to his first club. The move was made permanent in June and he retired after two more years, with Albacete now in the Segunda División.

Santi eventually returned to Atlético Madrid in early February 2009, as assistant to newly-appointed Abel Resino who had replaced Javier Aguirre. He was a caretaker manager for the fixture against RCD Mallorca on 24 October, before the appointment of Quique Sánchez Flores.

International career
Santi was capped twice for Spain, his debut coming on 11 October 1997 in a 1998 FIFA World Cup qualifier against Faroe Islands (3–1 in Gijón, playing the entire match). He still featured in a friendly win over Sweden in March 1998, but did not make the cut for the finals in France.

Previously, Santi appeared for the nation at the 1996 Summer Olympics. After retiring, he acted as head coach to Spain's under-16, under-17, under-19 and under-20 national teams, leading the third age group to the UEFA European Championship in 2019.

In December 2022, after Luis de la Fuente was promoted to the full side following Luis Enrique's resignation, Santi was named the former's replacement at the helm of the under-21s.

Honours

Player
Atlético Madrid
La Liga: 1995–96
Copa del Rey: 1995–96
Segunda División: 2001–02

Spain U21
UEFA European Under-21 Championship runner-up: 1996

Manager
UEFA European Under-19 Championship: 2019

References

External links

1974 births
Living people
Sportspeople from Albacete
Spanish footballers
Footballers from Castilla–La Mancha
Association football defenders
La Liga players
Segunda División players
Albacete Balompié players
Atlético Madrid footballers
Spain youth international footballers
Spain under-21 international footballers
Spain under-23 international footballers
Spain international footballers
Olympic footballers of Spain
Footballers at the 1996 Summer Olympics
Spanish football managers
La Liga managers
Atlético Madrid managers
Spain national under-21 football team managers